This page documents the tornadoes and tornado outbreaks of 1989, primarily in the United States. Most tornadoes form in the U.S., although some events may take place internationally. Tornado statistics for older years like this often appear significantly lower than modern years due to fewer reports or confirmed tornadoes.

Synopsis

1989 was an average year in terms of numbers of tornadoes and fatalities. May and June both saw over 200 tornadoes and after the usual summer lull, a significant November outbreak led to the devastating Huntsville, Alabama F4 tornado. There were three tornadoes in Nevada including an F0 on June 7 and two F1 tornadoes on September 17 and October 14, (both in Clark County) which is an unusually high number for the state.

Events

January
There were 14 tornadoes confirmed in the US in January.

January 7

A small tornado outbreak impacted parts of Illinois, Indiana, and Mississippi. An F4 tornado destroyed dozens of homes and businesses in Allendale, Illinois before moving into Indiana, injuring 55 people. An F2 tornado injured six people along an intermittent path in eastern Illinois, destroying six homes and damaging 46 in Mill Shoals. Another F2 tornado caused significant damage in the business district of Prairie, Mississippi.

February
There were 18 tornadoes confirmed in the US in February.

February 20–21

An outbreak brought 17 tornadoes to the Southern United States on February 20 and 21. Four F2 tornadoes touched down in northeastern Mississippi and northwestern Alabama. One caused significant damage near Sulligent, Alabama on February 20. All six tornadoes that touched down the next day were weak. An F0 tornado injured one person north of Dillon, South Carolina.

March
There were 43 tornadoes confirmed in the US in March.

March 4–5

An outbreak of tornadoes 13 tornadoes, stretching from Mississippi to Georgia, occurred through the overnight hours of March 4 and into the night of March 5. An F2 tornado traveled 53 miles through Chambers County, Alabama, Randolph County, Heard County, Georgia, and Coweta County, the tornado caused the first tornado-related fatality in Georgia since 1977 when a 68 year old man was killed in his mobile home near Franklin. A tornado also hit south and east of Newnan, Georgia, dealing F3 damage to a motel, ripping the roof off and collapsing walls injuring 8 people. Other buildings, such as those in the White Oaks subdivision were damaged or destroyed. Another F3 tornado occurred in Hinds County, Mississippi,the second of three tornadoes in a family, it destroyed 9 houses and 2 barns, injuring 5 and killing many cattle.

April
There were 82 tornadoes confirmed in the US in April.

April 3
An F3 tornado hit Fort Branch, Indiana. Although there were no fatalities, eight people were injured and damage was estimated between 5 and 50 million dollars.

April 26 (Bangladesh)

An extremely destructive and deadly tornado struck the Manikganj District in central Bangladesh. The tornado affected the cities of Daulatpur and Saturia the most, moving east through Daulatpur and eventually northeast and into Saturia. In total, this tornado killed an estimated 1,300 people making it the deadliest single tornado in world history.

May
There were 231 tornadoes confirmed in the US in May, including seven F4 tornadoes.

May 5

A deadly outbreak spawned 17 tornadoes in Georgia, South Carolina, North Carolina and Virginia, and was responsible for a combined total of $169 million in damage in the four states. It also caused seven deaths and 168 injuries.

May 24

On May 24, an outbreak brought 29 tornadoes to the Upper Midwest. An F4 tornado destroyed a farm near Prescott, Iowa, scattering three hundred pigs across a field. A second F4 tornado destroyed two farms east of Liscomb, Iowa. This storm injured three people on one farm according to Thomas P. Grazulis, but no injuries are listed in official records. An F2 tornado destroyed a home and several outbuildings near Cainsville, Missouri. All other tornadoes in this outbreak were weak, rated F0 or F1.

June
There were 252 tornadoes confirmed in the US in June.

June 8
Two tornadoes killed five people in Florida and Louisiana. In Baton Rouge, Louisiana, an F2 hit an aluminum plant at 6:30 AM, killing two. The same storm spawned a brief multi-vortex F1 in Plaquemine, Louisiana with no serious damage. Later in the afternoon, an F2 came ashore east of Apalachicola, Florida, killing three.

June 15
An F2 tornado touched down on the eastern end of the city of York and made a sporadic path of damage northeast across the Susquehanna River near Wrightsville to its endpoint. In York County the tornado crossed 8 miles of its path length, causing damage to 16 homes, a business, a church, 5 garages and 3 barns. Some of them received extensive damage. Many trees were uprooted or broken off and one woman was injured by a falling limb. The tornado was seen crossing the Susquehanna River drawing up water into its funnel at 5:30 PM EST. The tornado continued east for another 7 miles across Lancaster County, causing damage in Columbia, Mountville and just to the west of Millersville. In Lancaster County 4 homes were destroyed, 9 houses were damaged, and an excavating company warehouse was knocked down. Many trees were uprooted or broken off and many vehicles were damaged or destroyed. A total of 7 people received minor injuries, 3 in York County and 4 in Lancaster County.

June 25
A violent F3 wedge tornado ripped the roofs off of several homes in North Platte, Nebraska. There were no injuries reported.

July
There were 59 tornadoes confirmed in the US in July.

July 10

A series of tornadoes caused more than $130 million (1989 USD) in damage across the Northeastern United States on July 10. The storm system affected five states with severe weather, including hail up to 2.5 inches (6.4 cm) in diameter, thunderstorm winds up to 90 mph (150 km/h), and 17 tornadoes.

August
There were 36 tornadoes confirmed in the US in August.

September
There were 31 tornadoes confirmed in the US in September.

October
There were 30 tornadoes confirmed in the US in October.

November
There were 57 tornadoes confirmed in the US in November.

November 15–16

A destructive tornado outbreak affected a large swath of the southern and eastern United States as well as Canada in Mid-November. It produced at least 40 tornadoes, with 30 deaths coming as a result of two deadly tornadoes. The most devastating tornado occurred in Huntsville, Alabama, when an F4 tornado killed 21 people on the afternoon of the 15th. Twelve of the people killed in Huntsville were in cars. Nine more fatalities were reported at a single elementary school by an F1 tornado on the 16th in Newburgh, New York (although analysis has concluded that this was more likely the result of a downburst). Tornadoes occurred across 15 states and Quebec during the outbreak.

December
There were 3 tornadoes confirmed in the US in December.

December 12
One home was damaged near Chipley and five others were damaged near Cottondale. A satellite or twin funnel cloud was identified with this tornado. The National Centers for Environmental Information estimates the damage caused by the tornado was $500,000 (1989 USD).

See also
 Tornado
 Tornadoes by year
 Tornado records
 Tornado climatology
 Tornado myths
 List of tornado outbreaks
 List of F5 and EF5 tornadoes
 List of North American tornadoes and tornado outbreaks
 List of 21st-century Canadian tornadoes and tornado outbreaks
 List of European tornadoes and tornado outbreaks
 List of tornadoes and tornado outbreaks in Asia
 List of Southern Hemisphere tornadoes and tornado outbreaks
 List of tornadoes striking downtown areas
 Tornado intensity
 Fujita scale
 Enhanced Fujita scale

References

External links
 U.S. tornadoes in 1989 - Tornado History Project
 Tornado deaths monthly

 
1989 meteorology
Tornado-related lists by year
Torn